"Sure Fire Love" is a song recorded by Canadian country music artist Sean Hogan. It was released in 1999 as the second single from his second studio album, Hijacked. It peaked at number 9 on the RPM Country Tracks chart in August 1999.

Chart performance

Year-end charts

References

1999 songs
1999 singles
Sean Hogan songs